Hasora taminatus, the white banded awl, is a butterfly belonging to the family Hesperiidae, which is found in Asia.

Range
The butterfly is found in Sri Lanka, India, Myanmar, Cambodia Thailand, Laos, Hainan, Hong Kong, western China, Malaysia, the Indonesian archipelago (Borneo, Sumatra, Java, Nias, Sumbawa and Bali), the Philippines and Sulawesi.

In India the butterfly is found in South India, where it occurs in the Western Ghats, Kodagu, Nilgiri mountains and Palni hills; and in the Himalayas from Mussoorie eastwards to Sikkim and through to Myanmar. It is also found in the Andaman and Nicobar islands.

The type locality is South India.

Status
William Harry Evans (1932) reports that it is common in South India and not rare elsewhere.

Description

The butterfly, which has a wingspan of 45 to 55 mm, is dark brown and unmarked above; and resembles the common banded awl (Hasora chromus), except that it has a broad white band on the under hindwing which is sharply defined.  The female white banded awl has small spots on the upper forewing while the male has no brand above.

Detailed description
Edward Yerbury Watson (1891) gives detailed descriptions of H. t. malayana (C. & R. Felder, 1860), shown below:

Note: As H. t. malayana is sympatric with another subspecies, H. t. bhavara Fruhstorfer, 1911 in part of its range it has now been given specific status.

Host plants
The larva has been recorded on Derris scandens and Pongamia pinnatta species.

Subspecies
Hasora taminatus taminatus
Hasora taminatus vairacana Fruhstorfer, 1911 (Taiwan, Japan)
Hasora taminatus bhavara Fruhstorfer, 1911 (Sikkim)
Hasora taminatus padma Fruhstorfer, 1911 (Palawan)
Hasora taminatus malayana (C. & R. Felder, 1860) (Sikkim to Burma, Thailand, Laos, Hainan, Hong Kong, West China, Malaya, Borneo, Sumatra, Java, Nias, Sumbawa, Bali)
Hasora taminatus attenuata (Staudinger, 1889) (Sulawesi)
Hasora taminatus amboinensis Swinhoe, 1909 (New Guinea)

Cited references

References

Print

Watson, E. Y. (1891) Hesperiidae indicae. Vest and Co. Madras.

Online

Brower, Andrew V. Z., (2007). Hasora Moore 1881. Version 21 February 2007 (under construction). Page on genus Hasora in The Tree of Life Web Project http://tolweb.org/.

taminatus
Butterflies of Asia
Butterflies of Indochina
Butterflies of Singapore
Insects of Southeast Asia
Butterflies described in 1818